Balashovsky Uyezd was one of the subdivisions of the Saratov Governorate of the Russian Empire. It was situated in the western part of the governorate. Its administrative centre was Balashov.

Demographics
At the time of the Russian Empire Census of 1897, Balashovsky Uyezd had a population of 311,704. Of these, 86.5% spoke Russian, 13.2% Ukrainian, 0.1% German and 0.1% Belarusian as their native language.

References

 
Uezds of Saratov Governorate
Saratov Governorate